Midland Great Western Railway (MGWR) Classes 12, 14, 15, 16 and 19 were 36 0-4-2 locomotives acquired in 5 batches over the period 1861-1872. The first 0-4-2s were introduced by the Locomotive Superintendent Joseph Cabry, and his successor Robert Ramage in 1863 also seemed to favour the type.  After Martin Atock succeeded in 1872 there were no more orders of the type due to generally poor timekeeping.

MGWR Class 12

The MGWR Class 12 were a batch of 6 locomotives supplied by Fairbairn in 1860, the final locomotives from Fairbairn to the MGWR. They lasted just under 20 years, but by their last days were removed from goods to pilot and permanent way duties.  Initially numbered 43-48 they were later renumbered 49-54.

MGWR Class 14

For MGWR Class 14 the MGWR used a fresh supplier Neilsons of Glasgow. The class was introduced in 1863 and all were withdrawn by 1885.

MGWR Class 15

Neilsons supplied a further 6 0-4-2 locomotives in 1864 forming MGWR Class 15.

MGWR Class 16

For a batch of six 0-4-2 locomotives for 1867, the MGWR switched to Dübs and Company, also based in Glasgow. These became MGWR Class 16.

MGWR Class 19

For the final batch of new build locomotives, the MGWR switched supplier back to Neilsons. Following design changes instigated by Martin Atock, most of this batch had a four-ring boiler  longer with modified frames. With their withdrawal in 1892, the use of 0-4-2 by the MGWR came to an end.

References 

0-4-2 locomotives
5 ft 3 in gauge locomotives
Railway locomotives introduced in 1860
12
William Fairbairn & Sons locomotives
Scrapped locomotives
Steam locomotives of Ireland